The Federal Ministry of Humanitarian Affairs, Disaster Management and Social Development is a Nigerian ministry whose mission is to develop humanitarian policies and provide effective coordination of National and International humanitarian interventions. It was established on Wednesday August 21, 2019 by an Executive pronouncement by the President and Commander in Chief of the Armed Forces of Nigeria, H.E., Muhammadu Buhari GCFR at the inauguration of Ministers for the Federal Republic of Nigeria.

It is headed by a Minister appointed by the President, assisted by a Permanent Secretary, who is a career civil servant. President Muhammadu Buhari, GCFR on 24 August 2019 swore in Dr. Sadiya Umar Farouq as the Minister of Humanitarian Affairs, Disaster Management and Social Development with Dr.(Mrs) Bashir Nura Alkali FCA, FCIT as the permanent secretary in the ministry.

Agencies
 National Commission for Refugees, Migrants & Internationally Displaced Persons
 North-East Development Commission (NEDC)
 National Emergency Management Agency
 National Agency for Prohibition and Trafficking in Persons (NAPTIP)
 National Senior Citizens Centre
 National Commission for Person with Disabilities

References

Federal Ministries of Nigeria